Border Lake Provincial Park is a provincial park in British Columbia, Canada, located on the right (west) bank of the Unuk River and extending from that river's crossing of the Canada–United States border upstream.

External links

Boundary Ranges
Provincial parks of British Columbia
Canada–United States border
2001 establishments in British Columbia